Spring on Ice (German: Frühling auf dem Eis) is a 1951 Austrian musical comedy film directed by Georg Jacoby and starring Eva Pawlik, Herta Mayen and Hans Holt. It is set around the Vienna Ice Revue.

The film was shot using Agfacolor at the Soviet-controlled Rosenhügel Studios in Vienna. The film's sets were designed by the art director Julius von Borsody.

Cast

References

External links

1951 musical comedy films
Austrian musical comedy films
Films directed by Georg Jacoby
Figure skating films
Films shot at Rosenhügel Studios
Films scored by Nico Dostal